Cleyde Yáconis (14 November 1923 – 15 April 2013) was a Brazilian actress.

Life and career
She began her career at Brazilian Comedy Theater (TBC) with her sister, actress Cacilda Becker. Having a repertoire of more varied and illustrious theatrical dramaturgy nationwide. To Cleyde, has always been normal squad to play characters older than her own, perhaps because of its contralto voice and her serious features.

She actively participated in theater productions and television, in cinema but acted very little in more than a half-century career. Her last TV role was fun Dona Brigida Gouveia, in the Silvio de Abreu's telenovela Passione, aired by Rede Globo. Among her television work, stand out Mulheres de Areia, Os Inocentes, Gaivotas, Ninho da Serpente, Rainha da Sucata, Vamp and Torre de Babel.

Her most striking role was Isabelle de Bresson in Rainha da Sucata, a bankrupt millionaire who behaved as if she were still rich and did not accept the reality in which she lived.

On September 29, 2009, the former Cosipa Culture Theatre was renamed "Cleyde Yáconis Theatre" in honor of the actress who starred in the first play produced in the house - The Road to Mecca.

In July 2010, she withdrew from Passione, having broken her femur. She came back to production on August 12. Due to complications that had the implant prosthesis in her femur, the actress stayed away from the telenovela recordings for at least 15 days.

Death
On April 15, 2013, she died in Sírio-Libanês Hospital where she was hospitalized since March.

Filmography

Film
 Veneno (1952) - Gina (voice)
 Na Senda do Crime (1954) - Jurema
 A Madona de Cedro (1968) - Lola Boba
 Beto Rockfeller (1970)
 Parada 88 - O Limite de Alerta (1978) - Preacher
 Dora Doralina (1982)
 Jogo Duro (1985)
 Célia & Rosita (2000, Short)
 Bodas de Papel (2008) - Dona Cecília

Television

 O amor tem cara de mulher (1966, TV Tupi) - Vanessa
 Éramos Seis (1967, TV Tupi) - Dona Lola
 A Muralha (1968, TV Excelsior) - bandeirante (participation)
 Os Diabólicos (1968, TV Excelsior) - Paula
 A menina do veleiro azul (1969, TV Excelsior)
 Vidas em conflito (1969, TV Excelsior) - Ana
 Mais Forte que o Ódio (1970, TV Excelsior) - Clô
 Mulheres de Areia (1973, TV Tupi) - Clarita Assunção
 Os Inocentes (1974, TV Tupi) - Juliana
 Ovelha Negra (1975, TV Tupi) - Laura
 O Julgamento (1976, TV Tupi) - Mercedes
 Um dia, o amor (1976, TV Tupi) - Maria Eunice
 Aritana (1978, TV Tupi) - Elza
 Gaivotas (1979, TV Tupi) - Lídia
 Um homem muito especial (1980, Rede Bandeirantes) - Marta
 Floradas na Serra (1981, TV Cultura) - Dona Matilde
 O fiel e a pedra (1981, TV Cultura)
 O vento do mar aberto (1981, TV Cultura) - Clara
 Campeão (1982, Rede Bandeirantes) - Helena
 Ninho da Serpente (1982, Rede Bandeirantes) - Guilhermina Taques Penteado
 Meus Filhos, Minha Vida (1984, SBT) - Adelaide
 Uma Esperança no Ar (1985, SBT)
 Rainha da Sucata (1990) - Isabelle de Bresson
 Vamp (1991) - D. Virginia
 Olho no Olho (1993) - D. Julieta
 Sex Appeal (1993) - Cecília
 Os Ossos do Barão (1997, SBT) - Melica Parente de Redon Pompeo e Taques
 Torre de Babel (1998) - Diolinda Falcão
 As Filhas da Mãe (2001) - Dona Gorgo Gutierrez
 Um Só Coração (2004) - herself (special participation)
 Cidadão Brasileiro (2006, Rede Record) - Dona Joana Salles Jordão
 Eterna Magia (2007) - Dona Chiquinha (Francisca Finnegan)
 Passione (2010)

Theater

 O Anjo de Pedra by Tennessee Williams (1950)
 Pega-Fogo by Jules Renard (1950)
 Six Characters in Search of an Author by Luigi Pirandello (1951)
 Ralé by Máximo Gorki (1951)
 Right You Are (if you think so) by Luigi Pirandello (1953)
 Leonor de Mendonça by Gonçalves Dias (1954)
 Mary Stuart by Friedrich Schiller (1955)
 Eurydice by Jean Anouilh (1956)
 A Rainha e os Rebeldes by Ugo Betti (1957)
 O Santo e a Porca by Ariano Suassuna (1958)
 O Pagador de Promessas by Dias Gomes (1960)
 A Semente by Gianfrancesco Guarnieri (1961)
 A Escada by Jorge Andrade (1961)
 Death of a Salesman by Arthur Miller (1962)
 Yerma by Federico García Lorca (1962)
 Os Ossos do Barão by Jorge Andrade (1963)
 Vereda da Salvação by Jorge Andrade (1964)
 Toda Nudez Será Castigada by Nelson Rodrigues (1965) (Molière Award as Best actress)
 As Fúrias by Rafael Alberti (1966)
 O Fardão by Bráulio Pedroso (1967)
 Oedipus Rex by Sophocles (1967)
 Medea by Euripides (1970)
 A Capital Federal by Artur Azevedo (producer) (1972)
 The Lover by Harold Pinter (1978)
 A Nonna (1980)
 The Cherry Orchard by Anton Chekhov (1982)
 A Cerimônia do Adeus by Mauro Rasi (1989)
 O Baile de Máscaras by Mauro Rasi (1991) (Molière Award as Best actress)
 As Filhas de Lúcifer by William Luce (1993) (Mambembe Award as Best actress)
 Pericles, Prince of Tyre by William Shakespeare (1995)
 Long Day's Journey into Night by Eugene O'Neill (2002)
 Cinema Eden by Marguerite Duras (2005)
 The Madwoman of Chaillot by Jean Giraudoux (2006)
 The Road to Mecca by Athol Fugard (2008)
 Elas Não Gostam de Apanhar (2012)

References

External links
 

1923 births
2013 deaths
People from Pirassununga
Brazilian actresses